Donghu or Hu was a tribal confederation of nomadic people that was first recorded from the 7th century BCE and was destroyed by the Xiongnu in 150 BCE. They lived in northern Hebei, southeastern Inner Mongolia and the western part of Liaoning, Jilin and Heilongjiang along the Yan Mountains and Greater Khingan Range.

Name

Nomenclature

The Classical Chinese name  literally means "Eastern Barbarians". The term Dōnghú contrasts with the term Xīhú meaning "Western barbarians" (meaning "non-Chinese peoples in the west" and Five Barbarians 五胡 (Wǔ Hú) "five northern nomadic tribes involved in the Uprising of the Five Barbarians (304–316 CE)". Hill (2009:59) translates Xīhú as "Western Hu" and notes:

In 307 BCE, the 胡 Hú proper, also termed Dōnghú 東胡, were mentioned as a non-Chinese people who were neighbors of Zhao and skilled at mounted archery (a military tactic which King Wuling of Zhao would later adopt). However, the term Hu can also refer to a variety of different races and different ethnic groups. It was used by Han Chinese to describe anyone who is not of ethnic Han Chinese descent and were considered barbarians: for example, Sima Qian also used Hu to call the Xiongnu, who were then ruled by Touman chanyu, once expelled by Qin general Meng Tian north from the Ordos Loop, yet able to regain their territory following the Qin Empire's collapse. All Hu workmen were famed for their skills at making bows and carts even without specialization.

The peoples categorized as the Five Barbarians means "Five Hu" were the Xiongnu, Jie, Xianbei, Di, and Qiang. Of these five ethnic groups, the Xiongnu and Xianbei were nomadic peoples from the northern steppes. The ethnic identity of the Xiongnu is uncertain, but the Xianbei appear to have been Mongolic. The Jie, another pastoral people, may have been a branch of the Xiongnu, who may have been Yeniseian or Indo-Scythian. The Di and Qiang were from the highlands of western China. The Qiang were predominantly herdsmen and spoke Sino-Tibetan (Tibeto-Burman) languages, while the Di were farmers who may have spoken a Sino-Tibetan or Turkic language. The traditional explanation, going back to the second-century Han dynasty scholar Cui Hao 崔浩 is that the Donghu were originally located "east of the Xiongnu" who were one of the "Five Barbarians" (Hú). Modern Chinese apologetics suggests that "Donghu" was a transcription of an endonym and did not literally mean "Eastern Barbarian".

The usual English translation of Dōnghú is "Eastern Barbarians" (e.g., Watson, di Cosmo, Pulleyblank, and Yu), and the partial translation "Eastern Hu" is occasionally used (Pulleyblank). Note that "Eastern Barbarians" is also a translation for Dōngyì 東夷, which refers to "ancient peoples in eastern China, Korea, Japan, etc."

Chinese Sinocentrism differentiates the Huáxià  "Chinese" and the Yì 夷 "barbarians, non-Chinese, foreigner": this is referred to as the Huá–Yì distinction. Many names besides Hu originally had pejorative "barbarian" meanings, for instance Nanman 南蠻 ("southern barbarians") and Beidi 北狄 ("northern barbarians"). Edwin G. Pulleyblank explains:

The historian Nicola di Cosmo concludes:

In modern Standard Chinese usage hú has lost its original meaning although it still appears in words like èrhú 二胡 (lit. "two foreign") "Chinese two-string fiddle", hútáo 胡桃 ("foreign peach") "walnut", and húluóbō 胡萝卜 ("foreign radish") "carrot".

Etymology

The modern pronunciation Dōnghú differs from the Old Chinese pronunciation, which roughly dates from the Warring States Period (476–221 BCE) when Donghu was first recorded. Old Chinese reconstructions of Dōnghú include *Tûngɣâg, *Tungg'o, *Tewnggaɣ, *Tongga, and *Tôŋgâ > *Toŋgɑ. William H. Baxter and Laurent Sagart (2014) reconstruct the Old Chinese ancestor of  Hú as *[g]ˤa. Recently, Christopher Atwood reconstructs a foreign ethnonym *ga, which was borrowed into Old Chinese as 胡 *gâ (> hú), while an i-suffixed derivative of *ga underlies two Middle Chinese transcriptions: namely, 
*Bo-lâk Khėi (> Bùluò-Jī) (步落稽), based on the ethnonym of a people of Xiongnu, Mountain Rong or Red Di origins in Northern Shaanxi-Shanxi-Ordos; as well as
*Gʰiei, based on the ethnonym of the Mongolic-speaking Xī (奚), whom Arab geographers knew as Qāy.

The etymology of ethnonym *ga (> 胡 OC *gâ > Ch. hú) is unknown. As for *ga'''s possibly derivation Qay: Golden (2003) proposes several Mongolic etymologies: ɣai "trouble, misfortune, misery", χai "interjection of grief", χai "to seek", χai "to hew", albeit none compelling.Golden, P.B. (2003) "Cumanica II: The Olberli (Olperli): The Fortunes and Misfortunes of an Inner Asian Nomadic Clan" in Nomads and their neighbours in the Russian Steppe note. 49 p. 17 of 5-29

Some dictionaries and scholars (e.g. Jean-Pierre Abel-Rémusat) confuse Dōnghú 東胡 with Tungusic peoples, Tonggu 通古. Russian Mongolist Lydia Viktorova states that: 

This "chance similarity in modern pronunciation", writes Pulleyblank, "led to the once widely held assumption that the Eastern Hu were Tungusic in language. This is a vulgar error with no real foundation."

History

Among the northern ethnic groups, the Donghu was the earliest to evolve into a state of civilization and first developed bronze technology. Their culture was associated with the Upper Xiajiadian culture, characterized by the practice of agriculture and animal husbandry supplemented by handicrafts and bronze art. Through the use of cavalry and bronze weaponry in warfare, they dominated over the Xiongnu on their west.Liu (1994)Lü (2002), pp. 15–16.

The (ca. 109–91 BCE) Shiji section on Xiongnu history first records the Donghu during the era of Duke Wen of Jin (r. 697–628 BCE) and Duke Mu of Qin (r. ca. 659–621 BCE).At this time Qin and Jin were the most powerful states in China. Duke Wen of Jin expelled the Di barbarians and drove them into the region west of the Yellow River between the Yun and Luo rivers; there they were known as the Red Di and the White Di. Shortly afterwards, Duke Mu of Qin, having obtained the services of You Yu, succeeded in getting the eight barbarian tribes of the west to submit to his authority.
Thus at this time there lived in the region west of Long the Mianzhu, the Hunrong, and the Diyuan tribes. North of Mts. Qi and Liang and the Jing and Qi rivers lived the Yiqu, Dali, Wuzhi, and Quyuan tribes. North of Jin were the Linhu (Forest Barbarians) and the Loufan, while north of Yan lived the Donghu (Eastern Barbarians) and Shanrong (Mountain Barbarians), each of them with their own chieftains. From time to time they would have gatherings of a hundred or so men, but no one tribe was capable of unifying the others under a single rule.

In 307 BC King Wuling of Zhao (born 356 BC, reigned 325-299 BC), a contemporary of Alexander the Great (356-323 BC), instituted a military reform called "Hu clothes, Cavalry archery" after having been repeatedly harassed earlier in his reign by Donghu horse-archers. In 300 BCE Qin Kai, a general taken hostage from the state of Yan (whose capital "Ji" is now Beijing), defeated the Donghu after having gained the esteem of the Donghu and learning their battle tactics. In 273 BC (26th year of King Huiwen) Zhao defeated the Donghu. In 265 BC Li Mu of the Zhao state, one of the four most prominent generals of the Warring States period, defeated the Donghu after stopping a major Xiongnu invasion. By the time of the rule of the Xiongnu Chanyu Touman (c. 220 BCE to 209 BCE), "the Donghu were very powerful and the Yuezhi were likewise flourishing." When the Xiongnu crown prince Modu Chanyu killed his father Touman (in 209 BCE) and took the title of Chanyu, the Donghu thought that Modu feared them, and they started to ask for tribute from the Xiongnu, his best horses and even a consort of Modu's. Modu conceded. Not satisfied with this they asked for some of the Xiongnu territories. This enraged Modu who attacked and soundly defeated them, killing their ruler, taking his subjects prisoner, and seizing their livestock, before turning west to attack and defeat the Yuezhi (c. 177 BCE). This caused disintegration in the Donghu federation. Thereafter, the Wuhuan moved to Mt. Wuhuan and engaged in continuous warfare with the Xiongnu on the west and China on the south. As they came to be worn out from the lengthy battles, the Xianbei preserved their strengths by moving northward to Mt. Xianbei. When the Han dynasty vassal king Lu Wan defected to the Xiongnu in 195 BC he was created King of Donghu (東胡王) by the Xiongnu. This Kingdom of Donghu fiefdom lasted until 144 BC when Lu Wan's grandson Lu Tazhi defected back to the Han Dynasty. The Wuhuan (southern Donghu) inhabitants of the fiefdom continued as vassals of the Xiongnu until 121 BC. Gradually the name Donghu stopped being used. In the 1st century, the Xianbei (northern Donghu) defeated the Wuhuan and northern Xiongnu, and developed into a powerful state under the leadership of their elected Khan, Tanshihuai.Liu (1994)Lü (2002) 

The Book of Jin, published in 648, linked the Donghu and their Xianbei descendants to the Youxiong lineage (有熊氏), associated with the Yellow Emperor and possibly named after the Yellow Emperor's "hereditary principality". However, many non-Han Chinese rulers were claimed to be the Yellow Emperor's descendants, for individual and national prestige.Abramson, Mark Samuel (2008), Ethnic Identity in Tang China, University of Pennsylvania Press, p. 154

Chinese historian Yu Ying-shih describes the Donghu.The Tung-hu peoples were probably a tribal federation founded by a number of nomadic peoples, including the Wu-huan and Hsien-pi. After its conquest of the Hsiung-nu, the federation apparently ceased to exist. Throughout the Han period, no trace can be found of activities of the Tung-hu as a political entity.

Di Cosmo says the Chinese considered the Hu 胡 as "a new type of foreigner", and believes, "This term, whatever its origin, soon came to indicate an 'anthropological type' rather than a specific group or tribe, which the records allow us to identify as early steppe nomads. The Hu were the source of the introduction of cavalry in China."

Pulleyblank cites Paul Pelliot that the Donghu, Xianbei, and Wuhuan were "proto-Mongols".The Eastern Hu, mentioned in the Shih-chi along with the Woods Hu and the Lou-fan as barbarians to the north of Chao in the fourth century B.C., appear again as one of the first peoples whom the Hsiung-nu conquered in establishing their empire. Toward the end of the Former Han, as the Hsiung-nu empire was weakening through internal dissension, the Eastern Hu became rebellious. From then on they played an increasingly prominent role in Chinese frontier strategy as a force to play off against the Hsiung-nu. Two major divisions are distinguished, the Hsien-pei to the north and the Wu-huan to the south. By the end of the first century B.C. these more specific names had supplanted the older generic term.

Pulleyblank also writes that although there is now archaeological evidence of the spread of pastoral nomadism based on horse riding from Central Asia into Mongolia and farther east in the first half of the first millennium B.C.E., as far as we have evidence it did not impinge on Chinese consciousness until the northward push of the state of Zhao 趙 to the edge of the steppe in present Shanxi province shortly before the end of the fifth century B.C.E. brought them into contact with a new type of horse-riding “barbarian” that they called Hu 胡. … In Han times the term Hu was applied to steppe nomads in general but especially to the Xiongnu who had become the dominant power in the steppe. Earlier it had referred to a specific proto-Mongolian people, now differentiated as the Eastern Hu 東胡, from whom the Xianbei 鮮卑 and the Wuhuan 烏桓 later emerged.

Legacy

The Dōnghú later divided into the Wuhuan in the Yan Mountains and Xianbei in the Greater Khingan Range: the Wuhuan are ancestors of the Kumo Xi, while the Xianbei are ancestors of the Khitan and the Mongols. Another people of Donghu descent were the Rouran (Proto-Mongolic tribe).Pulleyblank (2000), p. 20, n. 57

In the past, scholars such as Fan Zuoguai and Han Feimu also mistakenly thought that Jurchens (ancestors of the Manchus) descended from the Donghu. In 1980, Russian scholar Lydia Leonidovna Viktorova criticized the 19th century phonetic identification of the ancient people of the Donghu (Eastern Hu) with the Tungus.

A genetic study published in the American Journal of Physical Anthropology detected the paternal haplogroup C2b1a1b among the Xianbei and Rouran. This lineage has also been found among the Donghu. Haplogroup C2b1a1b has a high frequency among Mongols.

Genetics

A genetic study published in the American Journal of Physical Anthropology in August 2018 detected the paternal haplogroup C2b1a1b among the Xianbei and Rouran. This lineage has also been found among the Donghu. The authors of the study suggested that haplogroup C2b1a1b was an important lineage among the Donghu, and that the Rouran were paternally descended from the Xianbei and Donghu. Haplogroup C2b1a1b has a high frequency among Mongols.

See also
Tangut
Lu Wan
Qin Kai

References

Sources

Baxter, William H. (1992). A Handbook of Old Chinese Phonology. Mouton de Gruyter.
DeFrancis, John, (2003). ABC Chinese-English Comprehensive Dictionary. University of Hawaii Press.
Di Cosmo, Nicola. (1999). "The Northern Frontier in Pre-imperial China", in Cambridge History of Ancient China, Cambridge University Press, pp. 885–966.
Di Cosmo, Nicola. (2002). Ancient China and its Enemies: The Rise of Nomadic Power in East Asian History. Cambridge University Press.  (hbk);  (pbk).
Dong, Tonghe [董同龢]. (1948). "Shanggu yinyun biao gao 上古音韻表搞", Bulletin of the Institute of History and Philology, Academia Sinica 18:1–249. 
Hao, Weimin [郝维民] and Qimudedaoerji [齐木德道尔吉]. (2007). Neimenggu tong shi gang yao [Outline of Comprehensive History of Inner Mongolia] 内蒙古通史纲要. Beijing [北京], Renmin chubanshe [People's Press] 人民出版社.
Hill, John. 2009. Through the Jade Gate to Rome: A Study of the Silk Routes during the Later Han Dynasty, First to Second Centuries CE. BookSurge. .
Janhunen, Juha (2003). The Mongolic Languages. Routledge.

Karlgren, Bernhard. (1957). Grammata Serica Recensa. Museum of Far Eastern Antiquities.
Lebedynsky, Iaroslav. (2007). Les nomades. Editions Errance, Paris. 
 
Liang Shih-Chiu (1992). Far East Chinese-English Dictionary. Far East Book Co.
Lin, Gan [林干]. (2007). Donghu shi [A History of the Donghu] 东胡史. Huhehaote [呼和浩特], Nei Menggu renmin chubanshe  内蒙古人民出版社.
Liu, Xueyao [劉學銚] (1994). Xianbei shi lun [the Xianbei History] 鮮卑史論. Taipei [台北], Nantian shuju [Nantian Press] 南天書局.
Lü, Jianfu [呂建福]. (2002). Tu zu shi [The Tu History] 土族史. Beijing [北京], Zhongguo shehui kexue chubanshe [Chinese Social Sciences Press] 中囯社会科学出版社.
Ma, Changshou [馬長壽]. (1962). Wuhuan yu Xianbei [Wuhuan and Xianbei] 烏桓與鮮卑. Shanghai [上海], Shanghai renmin chubanshe [Shanghai People's Press] 上海人民出版社.
Pulleyblank, Edwin G. (1994). “Ji Hu 稽胡: Indigenous Inhabitants of Shaanbei and Western Shanxi,” in Edward H. Kaplan, ed., Opuscula Altaica: Essays presented in honor of Henry Schwarz. ed. by. Bellingham: Western Washington University. pp. 518-519 of 499-531
Pulleyblank, Edwin G. (1983). "The Chinese and Their Neighbors in Prehistoric and Early Historic China," in The Origins of Chinese Civilization, University of California Press, pp. 411–466.
Pulleyblank, Edwin G. (2000). "Ji 姬 and Jiang 姜: The Role of Exogamic Clans in the Organization of the Zhou Polity", Early China 25:1–27.
Schuessler, Axel. (2007). An Etymological Dictionary of Old Chinese. University of Hawaii Press.
Wang, Zhongluo [王仲荦] (2007). Wei jin nan bei chao shi [History of Wei, Jin, Southern and Northern Dynasties] 魏晋南北朝史. Beijing [北京], Zhonghua shuju [China Press] 中华书局.

Watson, Burton. (1993). Records of the Grand Historian by Sima Qian. Translated by Burton Watson. Revised Edition. Columbia University Press. .
Yu Ying-Shih. (1986). "Han Foreign Relations," in The Cambridge History of China. 1. The Ch'in and Han Empires, Cambridge University Press, pp. 377–462.
Zhou Fagao [周法高]. (1972). "Shanggu Hanyu he Han-Zangyu 上古漢語和漢藏語", Journal of the Institute of Chinese Studies of the Chinese University of Hong Kong'' 5:159–244.

External links
The Hu Peoples, Silk Road Seattle Virtual Art Exhibit.
Non-Chinese peoples and neighboring states: Hu 胡, ChinaKnowledge.

 
States and territories established in the 7th century BC
States and territories disestablished in the 2nd century BC
Agglutinative languages
Ancient peoples of China
Ethnic groups in Chinese history
History of Manchuria
History of Mongolia
Former confederations